The black-backed tanager (Stilpnia peruviana) is a species of bird in the family Thraupidae. It is endemic to forest and shrub into south-eastern Brazil. When first described it was mistakenly believed that it originates from Peru, leading to the misleading scientific name peruviana. It is closely related to the chestnut-backed tanager, and the two have sometimes been considered conspecific.

It is threatened by habitat loss.

References

black-backed tanager
Birds of the Atlantic Forest
Endemic birds of Brazil
black-backed tanager
Taxonomy articles created by Polbot
Taxobox binomials not recognized by IUCN